The Armenian Numismatic Society is an educational nonprofit organization based in California. It was established in 1971 and remains the only organization devoted to Armenian numismatics.

References

External links
 The official website of the Armenian Numismatic Society

Armenian-American culture in California
Clubs and societies in California
Non-profit organizations based in California